"eBay" is a song by American parody musician "Weird Al" Yankovic.  It is a parody of "I Want It That Way" by Backstreet Boys. In the song, the narrator describes how he impulsively purchases unneeded (and bizarre) items on eBay (among them being "Shatner's old toupee", "a Dukes of Hazzard ashtray", and "a Kleenex used by Dr. Dre"). The song was taken from his eleventh studio album Poodle Hat.

Release
Released in 2003, "eBay" debuted at number fifteen on the Bubbling Under Hot 100 Singles several years later, due to the number of digital downloads it received.

Personnel
"Weird Al" Yankovic – lead and background vocals
Jim West – guitars
Steve Jay – bass guitar
Jon "Bermuda" Schwartz – drum programming
Kim Bullard – keyboards

Music video
The song "eBay" was performed live at eBay Live! 2003. A portion of this performance can be seen at the beginning of the CNBC documentary The eBay Effect: Inside a Worldwide Obsession. No official video has been produced.

Chart positions

See also
"Craigslist", another Yankovic song about a shopping website
List of songs by "Weird Al" Yankovic

References

2003 songs
Backstreet Boys
EBay
Mass media about Internet culture
Songs with lyrics by "Weird Al" Yankovic
Songs written by Andreas Carlsson
Songs written by Max Martin
"Weird Al" Yankovic songs